Cheilosporum is a genus of red algae in the family Corallinaceae.

The arrow coralline Cheilosporum sagittatum (Lamouroux) Areschoug is a seaweed of temperate waters of Australia (from Perth, Western Australia, to Coffs Harbour, New South Wales, and around Tasmania).

Species formerly placed in the genus
Arthrocardia corymbosa (Lamarck) Decaisne 1842, syn. Cheilosporum corymbosum (Lamarck) Decaisne 1842, is a red alga of South Africa (Southern Cape Peninsula eastward).

References

External links
 Cheilosporum at algaebase.org

Corallinaceae
Red algae genera